Anna Porphyrogenita (13 March 963 – 1011) was a Grand Princess consort of Kiev; she was married to Grand Prince Vladimir the Great.

Anna was the daughter of Byzantine Emperor Romanos II and the Empress Theophano. She was also the sister of Emperors Basil II and Constantine VIII. Anna was a Porphyrogenita, a legitimate daughter born in the special purple chamber of the Byzantine Emperor's Palace. Anna's hand was considered such a prize that some theorize that Vladimir became Christian just to marry her.

Anna did not wish to marry Vladimir and expressed deep distress on her way to her wedding. Vladimir was impressed by Byzantine religious practices; this factor, along with his marriage to Anna, led to his decision to convert to Eastern Christianity. Due to these two factors, he also began Christianizing his kingdom. By marriage to Grand Prince Vladimir, Anna became Grand Princess of Kiev, but in practice, she was referred to as Queen or Czarina, probably as a sign of her membership of the Imperial Byzantine House. Anna participated actively in the Christianization of Rus: she acted as the religious adviser of Vladimir and founded a few convents and churches herself. It is not known whether she was the biological mother of any of Vladimir's children, although some scholars have pointed to evidence that she and Vladimir may have had as many as three children together.  French historian, Jean-Pierre Arrignon argues that Yaroslav the Wise was in fact Anna's son, as this would explain his interference in Byzantine affairs in 1043. This view is corroborated by the study of Yaroslav's remains carried out in 1939–1940, which would place him amongst Vladimir's youngest children (with 986 as his estimated date of birth). Furthermore, Yaroslav's maternity by Rogneda of Polotsk has been questioned since Mykola Kostomarov in the 19th century.

See also
 Family life and children of Vladimir I

References

963 births
1011 deaths
Russian royal consorts
11th-century Byzantine women
11th-century Byzantine people
Daughters of Byzantine emperors
Macedonian dynasty
Porphyrogennetoi
Burials at the Church of the Tithes
Wives of Vladimir the Great